Babbs (formerly named Babbs Switch) is a community in Kiowa County, Oklahoma, United States. It was named for Edith "Babbs" Babcock.

Babbs was the scene of the nationally known Babbs Switch Fire on December 24, 1924, in which 36 people died in a school fire. Many of the dead were children, but several families were completely wiped out. Although the Babbs school house fire is the event for which this community is best known, Babbs had as its largest feature a grain elevator that served the local farmers as a depository for small grains (wheat, barley, oats, milo) until the late 1970s, when the elevator was closed due to its age and lack of repair by its owners, "Hobart Farmer's CO-OP".  There was also a gas station and a general store across Hwy 183 to the east, approximately two city blocks from the elevator. The Babbs school house was rebuilt and utilized until World War II's final days, when the Babbs school district was consolidated into the Roosevelt and Hobart school districts. All of the structures of the Babbs community are gone today and there is a small rest area and a stone marker where the original Babbs school house once stood.

Notes

References

Unincorporated communities in Kiowa County, Oklahoma
Unincorporated communities in Oklahoma
Ghost towns in Oklahoma